Stadio Pino Zaccheria is a multi-use stadium in Foggia, Italy, which was inaugurated in 1925. It is currently used mostly for football matches and is the home ground of Foggia Calcio. The stadium holds around 25,000 people.

History
The stadium is named after , a valiant lieutenant and athlete from Foggia, and a pioneer of local basketball, who lost his life during the Greco-Italian War in Tirana on 4 April 1941.

Notable matches

References

Pino Zaccheria
Pino
Calcio Foggia 1920
Sports venues in Apulia
Sports venues completed in 1925
1925 establishments in Italy